CMP-sialic acid transporter is a protein that in humans is encoded by the SLC35A1 gene.

See also
 Solute carrier family

References

Further reading

External links
  GeneReviews/NCBI/NIH/UW entry on Congenital Disorders of Glycosylation Overview

Solute carrier family